Gahmar railway station is a small railway station in Ghazipur district, Uttar Pradesh. Its code is GMR. It serves largest village of India  Gahmar village and locality. Gahmar is the nearest rail station to Maa Kamakhya Dham Temple.

The station consists of two platforms with a foot overbridge. The platform is now well sheltered, well furnished. It consists basic facilities including water and sanitation, waiting room, rain shades, a canteen, water cooler,  fan and lighting. The station lies on Patna–Mughalsarai section.

References

Railway stations in Ghazipur district
Danapur railway division